The 2004 West Virginia Democratic presidential primary was held on May 11 in the U.S. state of West Virginia as one of the Democratic Party's statewide nomination contests ahead of the 2004 presidential election.

Results

References 

West Virginia
Democratic primary
2004